An album is defined by Recorded Music New Zealand (RMNZ) as being a type of music release comprising at least five songs or a total playing time of over 25 minutes. Currently, Platinum certifications denote the shipment of 15,000 copies. When RMNZ (then known as the Recording Industry Association of New Zealand) introduced certifications in 1978, to reach Platinum status an album had to ship 20,000 copies. This was reduced to its current level in 1992.

The best-selling albums in New Zealand, as judged by certifications, are ABBA's greatest hits album, The Best of ABBA (1975) and Dire Straits' Brothers in Arms (1985); both have been certified 24-times Platinum. ABBA's album ABBA Gold: Greatest Hits (1992) is also one of New Zealand's best-selling albums. Pink Floyd and Ed Sheeran are the only other artists with two entries on the list. Hayley Westenra is the only artist of New Zealand origin with an album on this list.

Best-selling albums

Notes

References

New Zealand